Spirit of the West is a 1932 American Pre-Code Western film, directed by Otto Brower and starring Hoot Gibson, Doris Hill, and Hooper Atchley.

References

External links
Spirit of the West at the Internet Movie Database

1932 films
American Western (genre) films
1932 Western (genre) films
Films directed by Otto Brower
American black-and-white films
1930s American films
1930s English-language films